Patrick Daniel Kelly (September 17, 1936 – February 10, 1989) was a Canadian-born sportscaster best known for his radio play-by-play coverage of the St. Louis Blues of the National Hockey League, from early in their existence until his death more than two decades later, as well as for his national television work on NHL telecasts in both the United States and Canada.

Broadcasting NHL games on national television 
In addition to his 21 seasons broadcasting the Blues, Kelly broadcast NHL games on national television in the United States and Canada for a number of years. He broadcast 16 Stanley Cup Finals between 1969 and 1988, working for CBS, the NHL Network, the USA Network, CBC, CTV, and Global. He was also the lead play-by-play announcer of the 1987 Canada Cup, and also the lead play-by-play hockey announcer for CTV at the 1988 Winter Olympics in Calgary.

Memorable calls 
He was noted for his ability to project above the roaring crowds at the NHL arenas. He acknowledged that his booming call, "HE SHOOTS, HE SCORRRES!" was patterned after that of the famous long-time NHL announcer Foster Hewitt.

Kelly called two of the most famous goals in hockey history. One was Bobby Orr's Cup-winning overtime goal in 1970:

The other was Mario Lemieux's goal with 1:26 remaining in the decisive game 3 of the 1987 Canada Cup:

Kelly was also in the booth for another Stanley Cup winning goal, calling the action for CBS as Bob Nystrom won the Cup for the Islanders in 1980:

He also called a Stanley Cup semifinal in 1971 at Chicago Stadium (nicknamed "The Madhouse on Madison"). When the Blackhawks scored an empty-netter to clinch the series, he yelled, "I can feel our broadcast booth shaking! That's the kind of place Chicago Stadium is right now!"

Other sports broadcast by Kelly besides hockey 
Besides hockey, Kelly also broadcast NFL for CBS Sports, as well as Missouri Tigers football, St. Louis Cardinals baseball and St. Louis Cardinals football for St. Louis radio station KMOX at different times in his career. Dan also broadcast the 1964 Grey Cup from Toronto along with Don Whitman and Bud Grant.

Death and honors 
Kelly died on February 10, 1989, from lung cancer. His sons, John and Dan, have been broadcasting NHL games for various NHL franchises, including the Blues, for whom John is currently doing the television play-by-play.

Several months after his death, Kelly was the posthumous recipient of the Lester Patrick Trophy and the Foster Hewitt Memorial Award. In 2006, the St. Louis Blues dedicated the Enterprise Center press box in honor of Kelly.

See also

References

External links
 St.Louis Blues official site writeup on Dan Kelly
 St. Louis marks 20-year anniversary of Dan Kelly's death
 A man of many mikes, Dan Kelly broadcasts 145 games for five outlets
 
 Remembering Dan Kelly 30 Years Later
 How Dan Kelly Put the Blues on the Map

1936 births
1989 deaths
Canadian Football League announcers
Canadian sportspeople of Irish descent
Canadian sports announcers
Deaths from lung cancer in Missouri
Foster Hewitt Memorial Award winners
Major League Baseball broadcasters
Missouri Tigers football announcers
National Football League announcers
National Hockey League broadcasters
Ice hockey people from Ottawa
St. Louis Blues announcers
St. Louis Cardinals announcers
St. Louis Cardinals (football) announcers
Lester Patrick Trophy recipients
North American Soccer League (1968–1984) commentators